James Simon Hodgson (born 1969) is the Headmaster of Bedford School and a former English cricketer.

Biography

Born in Guildford, Surrey, on 30 April 1969, James Hodgson was educated at Wellington College and Durham University. He continued his studies at Hughes Hall, Cambridge. He taught at Tonbridge School, was Usher at Magdalen College School, Oxford, and became the Headmaster of Bedford School in 2014.

Cricket

James Hodgson was a right-handed batsman who bowled right-arm off break. He made his first-class debut for Cambridge University against Nottinghamshire in 1994. During the 1994 season, he represented the University in 9 first-class matches, the last of which came against Oxford University.  In those 9 matches, he scored 256 runs at a batting average of 18.28, with a single half century high score of 54. In the field he took 8 catches.  With the ball he took 15 wickets at a bowling average of 48.80, with best figures of 4/14.

Family

James Hodgson's brother, Tim, played first-class cricket for Essex as well as List A cricket for the Surrey Cricket Board. His great-uncle, Neville Knox, played Test cricket for England as well as first-class cricket for Surrey and the Marylebone Cricket Club.

References

External links
James Hodgson at Cricinfo
James Hodgson at CricketArchive

1969 births
Living people
Sportspeople from Guildford
People educated at Wellington College, Berkshire
Headmasters of Bedford School
English cricketers
Cambridge University cricketers
Alumni of Durham University
Alumni of Hughes Hall, Cambridge